Citricoccus alkalitolerans is an alkalitolerant bacterium from the genus Citricoccus which has been isolated from soil from the eastern desert of Egypt.

References

Bacteria described in 2005
Micrococcaceae